Thornburg is an unincorporated community in Spotsylvania County in the U.S. state of Virginia. Thornburg is centered on the intersection of the Jefferson Davis Highway (U.S. 1) with Morris, Mudd Tavern, and South Roxbury Mill Roads. According to the Geographic Names Information System, Thornburg has also been known as Mudd Tavern and Thornsburg throughout its history. The town is located near Interstate 95 exit 118, where several motels and travel-related businesses exist.

References

External links 

Unincorporated communities in Spotsylvania County, Virginia
Unincorporated communities in Virginia